Mystriophis is a genus of eels in the snake eel family Ophichthidae. It currently contains the following species:

 Mystriophis crosnieri Blache, 1971
 Mystriophis rostellatus (J. Richardson, 1848) (African spoon-nose eel)

References

 

Ophichthidae